This was a new event in 2012.

Shelby Rogers won the title defeating Samantha Crawford in the final 6–4, 6–7(3–7), 6–3.

Seeds

Main draw

Finals

Top half

Bottom half

References
 Main Draw
 Qualifying Draw

ITF Women's Circuit - Yakima - Singles